The Korean National Semi-professional Football Championship (Hangul: 전국실업축구선수권대회) was a league cup held by Korean National Semi-Professional Football League. It was the predecessor of the Korea National League Championship.

Champions

List of champions

Titles by club

See also
Korean Semi-professional Football League
Korean National Football Championship
Korean President's Cup
Korea National League Championship

References

Defunct football competitions in South Korea